The AL-52 is a compressed air launcher of British origin manufactured by Plumett Ltd. The AL-52 is capable of launching grappling hooks for the likes of special forces and line throwing. The AL-52 can also be mounted onto the ground for launching heavier payloads.

Users
 - Irish Special Forces
 - UKSF

References

Tools
Climbing equipment
Mountaineering equipment
Pneumatic mortars